Garrya wrightii is a species of flowering plant in the family Garryaceae known by the common names Wright's silktassel, quinine-bush, coffee berry, bearberry, feverbush, and grayleaf dogwood.

Distribution
The plant is native to northern Mexico and to the southwestern United States in Arizona, New Mexico, and Texas.

Description
It has branches that are square in cross-section and thick, tough leaves.

The species is dioecious with male and female reproductive parts occurring on separate plants. Both flower types are borne in catkin-like spikes. They are green.

The fruit is a rounded purple berry under a centimeter wide containing one or two seeds. The seeds are dispersed by birds that eat the berries.

Ecology
This shrub grows in chaparral, pinyon-juniper woodlands, and Madrean pine-oak woodlands. It is rarely dominant but it occurs in many types of plant communities.

It grows alongside many species of oak such as Emory oak (Quercus emoryi), gray oak (Quercus grisea), and Coahuila scrub oak (Quercus intricata).

Other plants in the habitats may include birchleaf mountain-mahogany (Cercocarpus betuloides), true mountain-mahogany (Cercocarpus  montanus), skunkbush sumac (Rhus trilobata), desert ceanothus (Ceanothus greggii), pointleaf manzanita (Arctostaphylos pungens), Pringle manzanita (Arctostaphylos pringlei), yellowleaf silktassel (Garrya flavescens), and hollyleaf buckthorn (Rhamnus crocea).

It is adapted to wildfire-prone habitat, resprouting after being top-killed in fires.

Uses
Small amounts of rubber can be made from it.

Livestock occasionally eat the plant, goats are especially partial to it. Cattle tend to dislike it because of its bitter taste. Many wild ungulates, such as mule deer, bighorn sheep, and elk browse it.

Cultivation
Garrya wrightii is cultivated as an ornamental plant, for planting as a shrub or small multi-trunked tree in gardens. It is used in drought tolerant and wildlife gardens, in natural landscaping design, for erosion control, and for habitat restoration projects.

References

External links
USDA Plants Profile for Garrya wrightii
Garrya wrightii —CalPhotos Photo Gallery
The Nature Conservancy: Garrya wrightii

Garryales
Flora of Arizona
Flora of New Mexico
Flora of Northeastern Mexico
Flora of Northwestern Mexico
Flora of Chihuahua (state)
Flora of Texas
Garden plants of North America
Drought-tolerant plants
Plants described in 1857